The Clasico Capitalino (Capital's Derby), also known as the  local derby played between F.C. Motagua and C.D. Olimpia.  These two teams lead the Honduran Football League as most frequent holders of the championship trophy, and their rivalry is the biggest one in the country.  Olimpia wears the white uniform, with blue and red highlights.  Their mascot is a lion. Olimpia is the oldest team in the league and holds the largest number of championship titles.

Motagua wears a navy blue uniform.  It is nearly as old a team as Olimpia.  Motagua’s mascot is an eagle and has the second largest number of championship titles.

The rivalry is so big that in 1949 Carlos Valladares' uniform was burned on the field because he left Motagua to play with Olimpia.  The first ever recorded Superclásico was a friendly played on 12 March 1929, when Motagua prevailed 2–1.  The first official match was played on 8 August 1965, with Olimpia winning 3–0.

All stats accurate as of match played 6 November 2022.

The Finals
Motagua and Olimpia had faced in nine finals since the beginning of the professional league in 1965–66, 7 won by Motagua and 2 by Olimpia.  The extra game played in 1970–71 for the title is not technically a final.

Historic matches

Decisive encounters

Matches outside Tegucigalpa

Largest victories

Head to Head

This is a list of head to head encounters in every different stages.

MW = Motagua's win | OW = Olimpia's win | D = Drawn | MG = Motagua's goals | OG = Olimpia's goals

Common results

Series won by club
 Won by Olimpia: 37
 1965–66, 1966–67, 1969–70, 1973–74, 1979–80, 1984–85, 1987–88, 1988–89, 1989–90, 1990–91, 1992–93, 1993–94, 1994–95, 1995–96, 1996–97, 1998–99, 1999–00 A, 2000–01 C, 2002–03 A, 2003–04 A, 2004–05 A, 2004–05 C, 2005–06 A, 2008–09 C, 2009–10 A, 2010–11 A, 2011–12 A, 2012–13 A, 2012–13 C, 2013–14 C, 2014–15 C, 2015–16 C, 2017–18 C, 2018–19 A, 2019–20 A, 2020–21 A, 2020–21 C.
 Won by Motagua: 21
 1968–69, 1974–75, 1975–76, 1976–77, 1978–79, 1980–81, 1981–82, 1985–86, 1999–00 C, 2001–02 A, 2001–02 C, 2002–03 C, 2007–08 A, 2008–09 A, 2009–10 C, 2010–11 C, 2014–15 A, 2015–16 A, 2018–19 C, 2019–20 C, 2021–22 A.
 Series tied: 21
 1967–68, 1970–71, 1971–72, 1977–78, 1982–83, 1983–84, 1986–87, 1991–92, 1997–98 A, 1997–98 C, 2000–01 A, 2003–04 C, 2005–06 C, 2006–07 A, 2006–07 C, 2007–08 C, 2013–14 A, 2016–17 A, 2016–17 C, 2017–18 A, 2021–22 C.

Players

All-time top scorers
List of top scorers for both clubs.

Currently active scorers
This is a list of those active players who have scored against one or both teams.

 Motagua
 Roberto Moreira 7
 Marcelo Pereira 3
 Eddie Hernández 2, (he also scored 2 goals for Olimpia)
 Walter Martínez 2
 Óscar García 1
 Josué Villafranca 1
 Cristopher Meléndez 1
 Juan Delgado 1
 Mauro Ortiz 1

 Olimpia
 Jerry Bengtson 7, (he also scored 4 goals for Motagua)
 Justin Arboleda 3
 Michaell Chirinos 4
 Éver Alvarado 1
 Matías Garrido 1
 Diego Reyes 1
 José García 1
 José Pinto 1
 Brayan Velásquez 1
 Gabriel Araújo 1
 Jorge Álvarez 1

Players that played for both teams
List of players who switched from one club to the other:

Players who scored for both sides
Only nine players have scored goals in this derby wearing both kits.
  José Januario
  Denilson Costa
  Álvaro Izquierdo
  Marlon Hernández
  José Romero
  Gustavo Fuentes
  Javier Estupiñán
  Jerry Bengtson
  Eddie Hernández

Coaches
Ramón Maradiaga has coached 44 matches against Olimpia winning 15, drawing 14 and losing 15.

References

Association football rivalries in Honduras
F.C. Motagua
C.D. Olimpia
Tegucigalpa